The 2019–20 season was Leeds United's tenth consecutive season in the Championship. Along with competing in the Championship, the club also participated in the FA Cup and EFL Cup. The season covered the period from 1 July 2019 to 22 July 2020. Competition was interrupted by the COVID-19 pandemic, and the decision to suspend the Championship season was made on 13 March. League matches resumed on 20 June, with fixtures to be played until late July.
After spending the season at or near the top of the league table, Leeds were promoted to the Premier League on 17 July because West Bromwich Albion lost 1–2 against Huddersfield Town.
The following day, Leeds were confirmed as league champions after Brentford suffered defeat at Stoke City.

Transfers

In

Loans in
{| class="wikitable" style="text-align:center;"
!Start date
!Position
!Name
!From
!End date
!
|-
| 1 July 2019 || MF ||Jack Harrison ||Manchester City|| 30 June 2020 || 
|-
| 1 July 2019 || DF ||Ben White ||Brighton & Hove Albion|| 30 June 2020 || 
|-
| 2 July 2019 || MF ||Jack Clarke ||Tottenham Hotspur|| 1 January 2020 || 
|-
| 3 July 2019 || MF ||Hélder Costa{{Efn|Deal for Hélder Costa to be made permanent at the end of the 2019/20 season in July 2020.}} ||Wolverhampton Wanderers|| 30 June 2020 || 
|-
| 8 August 2019 || GK ||Illan Meslier ||Lorient || 30 June 2020 || 
|-
| 8 August 2019 || FW ||Eddie Nketiah ||Arsenal|| 1 January 2020 || 
|-
| 27 January 2020 || FW ||Jean-Kévin Augustin || RB Leipzig || 30 June 2020 || 
|}

Loans out

Transfers out

Pre-season
On 17 June 2019, Leeds announced their pre-season programme. A trip to Italy to face Cagliari was also confirmed.

First-team squadPlayers' ages are as of the opening day of the 2019–20 season (Friday 2 August).Notes: Deal for Hélder Costa to be made permanent at the end of the 2019-20 season in July 2020''

Competitions

Championship

League table

Results summary

Results by matchday

Matches
On Thursday, 20 June 2019, the EFL Championship fixtures were revealed.

FA Cup

The third round draw was made live on BBC Two from Etihad Stadium, Micah Richards and Tony Adams conducted the draw.

EFL Cup

The first round draw was made on 20 June. The second round draw was made on 13 August 2019 following the conclusion of all but one first round matches.

Player statistics

Appearances and goals
Players with no appearances not included in the list. The plus (+) symbol denotes an appearance as a substitute, hence 2+1 indicates two appearances in the starting XI and one appearance as a substitute.

|-
! colspan=14 style=background:#dcdcdc; text-align:center| Goalkeepers

|-
! colspan=14 style=background:#dcdcdc; text-align:center| Defenders

|-
! colspan=14 style=background:#dcdcdc; text-align:center| Midfielders

|-
! colspan=14 style=background:#dcdcdc; text-align:center| Forwards

|-
! colspan=14 style=background:#dcdcdc; text-align:center| Players transferred out during the season

Under 23s: Professional Development League

Results summary

Matches

On Thursday, 1 August 2019, the Professional Development League fixtures were revealed.  The league was cancelled following the COVID-19 pandemic.

Notes

References

Leeds United
Leeds United F.C. seasons
2010s in Leeds
2020s in Leeds